Guata is a municipality in the north west of the Honduran department of Olancho, west of Gualaco, north of Manto and east of Jano and Esquipulas del Norte.

Demographics
At the time of the 2013 Honduras census, Guata municipality had a population of 11,784. Of these, 93.75% were Mestizo, 2.87% White, 2.21% Indigenous (2.03% Nahua), 0.26% Black or Afro-Honduran and 0.91% others.

References

Municipalities of the Olancho Department